Margaret Ann "Meg" Ryan (born May 23, 1964) is a senior judge of the United States Court of Appeals for the Armed Forces. She joined the court in 2006 after being nominated by President George W. Bush. Her term expired on July 31, 2020.

Early life and education 
Born in Chicago, Illinois, Ryan attended Homewood-Flossmoor High School, and graduated from Knox College with a Bachelor of Arts degree in political science in 1985. Ryan attended law school under the Marine Corps Law Education Program at the University of Notre Dame Law School, where she also was a member of the Notre Dame Law Review. She received  her Juris Doctor degree, summa cum laude,  in 1995 and was awarded the Colonel William J. Hoynes Award as valedictorian of her class.

Legal career 
Following graduation from Knox College, Ryan served on active duty for the United States Marine Corps from 1988 to 1992, and again following Law School graduation as a judge advocate from 1995 to 1999. Ryan served in units within the II & III Marine Expeditionary Forces as a Staff Officer, Company Commander, Platoon Commander, and Operations Officer. Judge Ryan's tours included deployments to the Philippines, during a coup attempt, and to Saudi Arabia during Desert Shield and Desert Storm.  As a Judge Advocate General (JAG) officer, Ryan served as a Trial Counsel and Chief Trial Counsel in Okinawa, Japan and Quantico, Virginia. Ryan was then selected by General Charles C. Krulak, Commandant of the Marine Corps, to serve as his Aide de Camp.

Ryan was law clerk to Judge J. Michael Luttig of the United States Court of Appeals for the Fourth Circuit, and then to Justice Clarence Thomas of the United States Supreme Court in 2001–2002.

Prior to joining the court, Ryan was in private practice. She was at Wiley Rein LLP from 2004 until her appointment to the court. Before that she was with Bartlit Beck Herman Palenchar & Scott from 2002 to 2004 and Cooper, Carvin & Rosenthal from 1999 to 2000.

As of 2022, she is the J.J. Clynes Endowed Visiting Professor of Law at Notre Dame Law School, where she teaches Evidence, Military Law, and Constitutional Issues in the Military Justice System. Judge Ryan is also a Lecturer on Law at Harvard Law School and an elected member of the American Law Institute.

Court of Appeals service 
Ryan was nominated to the United States Court of Appeals for the Armed Forces by President George W. Bush on November 15, 2006 to replace Judge H. F. Gierke III, who retired September 30, 2006. She was confirmed less than a month later by the U.S. Senate on December 9, 2006 by unanimous consent. Ryan's appointment for a 15-year term was due to expire on July 31, 2021. However, the Court of Appeals for the Armed Forces website  indicated that Judge Ryan's term would end on July 31, 2020.

In 2012, Judge Ryan joined the court majority that found that it did not have jurisdiction to order disclosure of trial documents from the Chelsea Manning court-martial.  When the court majority reversed the conviction of a soldier for attempting suicide, Judge Ryan dissented, arguing that the appeals court did not have jurisdiction.

In September 2016, Ryan was named as a possible nominee to the Supreme Court of the United States by Republican presidential candidate Donald Trump.

Judge Ryan is married to Michael J. Collins.

See also
 List of law clerks of the Supreme Court of the United States (Seat 10)
 Donald Trump Supreme Court candidates

References 

1964 births
Living people
People from Chicago
Homewood-Flossmoor High School alumni
Knox College (Illinois) alumni
United States Marine Corps officers
Notre Dame Law School alumni
Law clerks of J. Michael Luttig
American military lawyers
20th-century American lawyers
21st-century American lawyers
20th-century American women lawyers
21st-century American women lawyers
Law clerks of the Supreme Court of the United States
21st-century American judges
21st-century American women judges
Judges of the United States Court of Appeals for the Armed Forces
United States Article I federal judges appointed by George W. Bush